Jack Stansfield (born 1896) was an English professional footballer who played as an outside left.

Career
Born in Bradford, Stansfield spent his early career with Bradford (Park Avenue) and Castleford Town. He signed for Bradford City in August 1919, making 2 league appearances for the club, before signing for Hull City in January 1922. At Hull he made 11 league appearances before returning to Castleford Town.

His great-grandson James Stansfield was also a footballer; both played for Bradford (Park Avenue).

Sources

References

1896 births
Date of death missing
English footballers
Bradford (Park Avenue) A.F.C. players
Castleford Town F.C. players
Bradford City A.F.C. players
Hull City A.F.C. players
English Football League players
Association football outside forwards